BBG may refer to:   

 Baseball Ground, the former home of Derby County F.C.
 Bay of Bengal Gateway, an international submarine communications cable
 Beibehaltungsgenehmigung, a certificate allowing a person to retain German citizenship while also naturalizing as a citizen of another country
 Belize Botanic Gardens
 License plate code for Bernburg (district), Germany
 Branson Airport, Branson, Missouri, with the FAA location identifier BBG
 Billabong (clothing), Australian Stock Exchange symbol
 B'nai B'rith Girls, the women's order of B'nai B'rith Youth Organization
 Board of Broadcast Governors, forerunner to the Canadian Radio-television and Telecommunications Commission from 1958 to 1968
 Bradford & Bingley, a bank in the UK
 Brilliant Blue G, a type of Coomassie dye
 British business group, an association or club of expatriate British business people
 Broadcasting Board of Governors, the former name of U.S. Agency for Global Media, an independent agency of the United States government responsible for all non-military, international broadcasting sponsored by the U.S government 
 Brooklyn Botanic Garden, in the borough of Brooklyn in New York City
 Browser based game   
 BBG, the United States Navy hull classification symbol for a Guided Missile Battleship
 the postal code of Birżebbuġa, Malta
 BBG Academy, a secondary school in Birkenshaw, West Yorkshire, England
Boutros Boutros-Ghali, an Egyptian politician and diplomat